Judy Quinn (born 1974) is a Canadian writer and editor living in Quebec.

Biography
She was born in Quebec City and studied literature at the Université du Québec à Montréal and the Université de Toulouse-Le Mirail in France. She is literary critic and editor for the literary journal Nuit blanche. She also has contributed to various publications including Le Devoir.

Quinn published three collections of poetry: L'émondé (2008), Six heures vingt (2010) and Les damnés inflationnistes''' (2012).

In 2013, she was writer in residence at the Cité internationale des arts in Paris.

References 

1974 births
Living people
Canadian women journalists
Canadian women poets
Canadian poets in French
Canadian novelists in French
Writers from Quebec City
Université du Québec à Montréal alumni
21st-century Canadian poets
21st-century Canadian novelists
Canadian women novelists
21st-century Canadian women writers
Canadian women non-fiction writers